Local elections were held in Scotland in May 1973, as part of that year's wider British local elections. The elections were the last to the local authorities created under the Local Government (Scotland) Act 1929, and were replaced in 1975 by a uniform system of regions and districts.

Elections to the 4 city corporations, 21 town councils of large burghs and 176 town councils of small burghs took place on 1 May 1973; elections to the 33 county councils took place a week later on 8 May 1973.

Municipal elections

Results by council

Counties of cities

Large burghs

Notes

References

 
1973
May 1973 events in the United Kingdom